The Oxford micropolitan area may refer to:

The Oxford, North Carolina micropolitan area, United States
The Oxford, Mississippi micropolitan area, United States

See also
Oxford metropolitan area (disambiguation)
Oxford (disambiguation)